Liberman is the fifth studio album by American singer-songwriter Vanessa Carlton, released in the US on October 23, 2015 and in the UK and Europe on April 29, through Dine Alone Records. It is the follow up to Carlton's 2011 album Rabbits on the Run and marks her first release since signing with Dine Alone Records. The title of the album comes from an oil painting made by Carlton's late grandfather, whose given surname was Liberman.

Background and writing
Following the 2011 release Rabbits on the Run, Carlton took time off to get married, start a family, and write another album. She told CBS News that these changes in her life are reflected in Liberman's songs, and that she "wanted the whole album to feel like an escape type of album, where you put it on and you feel like you're in this dreamy state."

To avoid preconceived notions, demos recorded were sent to Dine Alone Records without Carlton's name attached. Label president Joel Carriere says of hearing the demos: The songs were amazing, it was atmospheric, it kind of fit into what we're all into ... and we never would have guessed it was Vanessa Carlton because her voice has developed so much since her pop songs 14 years ago and the songwriting had obviously changed. We were, like: "Yeah, we want to do this. But what is it we're doing?"

Promotion
In support of the album, Carlton embarked on the "Liberman" tour throughout portions of the United States and Canada in the fall of 2015 and winter of 2016. Special guest on the tour was Joshua Hyslop. The tour continued in the UK and Europe in the spring of 2016.

Singles
The first single, "Operator", was released for digital download on September 25, 2015. A music video for the single, directed by Daniel Henry, was released on October 13, 2015. According to Carlton, the video shows the classic tale of children running away reversed, so instead the parents are running away. The second single, "House of Seven Swords", was released for digital download. Since Liberman was already released, it was not released separately, like "Operator", but it was made a single on November 18, 2015. Daniel Henry also directed a music video for "House of Seven Swords" which was released the same day as the single and shows Carlton playing piano and singing the song at home in Nashville. The Wall Street Journal writes of the video:she takes her baby daughter out into the yard, making "House of Seven Swords" seem like sage advice from mother to child. In a way, Carlton says, it is. "At the same time, the song is absolutely a message to myself, too, probably," she says. Henry shot the footage they used in the video in about an hour while making a different clip with Carlton, and they fit the images to the song. "It was all very organic," she says. Steve Osborne's remix of "Nothing Where Something Used To Be" was released worldwide as the third single off Liberman on April 8, 2016.

Other songs
Other songs from Liberman were released with music and lyric videos for promotional purposes. "Young Heart", a song that does not appear on the album, was released as a "pre-single" with an "Official Dream Video" on April 20, 2015, as a way to release information that Carlton had signed with Dine Alone Records. A music video for "Blue Pool" was released on August 3, 2015, to promote the Blue Pool EP. A lyric video was released for "Willows" on August 27, 2015, as a way to reveal the album artwork, track listing, and release date. On November 17, 2015, The Wall Street Journal premiered the music video for "House of Seven Swords".

Critical reception

Liberman received mostly positive reviews from music critics. At Metacritic, which assigns a normalized rating out of 100 to reviews from mainstream critics, the album has an average score of 77 out of 100, which indicates "generally favorable reviews" based on 7 reviews.

Stephen Thomas Erlewine of AllMusic rated the album four out of five stars, stating: "Carlton is still avoiding any of the grand gestures that defined her earliest work but at this point, this quietly meditative pop feels like a truer reflection of her intentions than 'A Thousand Miles'." Pitchfork's Matthew Schnipper rated the album 7.8 out of ten, writing: "Carlton's voice is the key attraction on songs [from Liberman] that register between low-key pop, rock, and folk." The Boston Globe's Ken Capobianco states: "Carlton's reinvention finds her a long way from 'A Thousand Miles' – and in a better place, artistically."

Track listing
Adapted from AllMusic and the album's liner notes.

Personnel
Credits adapted from AllMusic

Musicians
 Vanessa Carlton – keyboards, organ, piano, tambourine, vocals
 Adam Landry – drums, bass, electric guitar, acoustic guitar, synthesizer
 John J. McCauley III – drums, guitar, bass
 Steve Osborne – drums, guitar, bass, keyboards, synthesizer
 Skye Steele – violin

Technical
 Steve Osborne – mixing, producer
 Adam Landry – engineer, producer, programming
 Craig Alvin – mixing
 Rishon Blumberg – A&R
 Eddie Chacon – photography
 Jahved Crockett – design
 Jo Ratcliffe – art direction, illustration
 Skye Steele – string arrangement

Charts

Release history

References

2015 albums
Dine Alone Records albums
Vanessa Carlton albums
Albums produced by Steve Osborne